Montello is a comune (municipality) in the Province of Bergamo in the Italian region of Lombardy, located about  northeast of Milan and about  southeast of Bergamo.

Montello borders the following municipalities: Albano Sant'Alessandro, Bagnatica, Costa di Mezzate, Gorlago, San Paolo d'Argon.

Demographic evolution

References